The Melbourne Victory 2012–13 season is Melbourne Victory's eighth A-League season.

Season summary
At the start of the 2012–13 season Ubay Luzardo and Jean Carlos Solórzano returned to their respective clubs after their loan deals had expired.

In April 2012 Ange Postecoglou was appointed as Melbourne Victory manager. Veterans Grant Brebner and Ante Covic were released from Melbourne Victory. Fabio was then released and signed a two-year contract with archrival Sydney FC.

In May 2012, it was announced that Carlos Hernandez had exited Melbourne Victory after the club couldn't come to agree a new deal with him as they attempted to slash costs to fit him into the salary cap. On 26 May, Matthew Kemp retired from the A-League.

In June 2012 Harry Kewell quit Melbourne Victory to return to England to be with his family due to problems with his mother-in-law's health.

Several signings took place during pre-season period. Ivorian defender Adama Traoré was signed from the defunct Gold Coast United, Sam Gallagher was signed from Central Coast Mariners, Brazilian attacking midfielder Guilherme Finkler was signed from Criciúma Esporte Clube, Mauritian defensive midfield Jonathan Bru was signed from Moreirense F.C., Spase Dilevski was signed from Adelaide United, Theo Markelis was signed from Vicenza Calcio, former Johnny Warren Medal winner Marco Flores was signed from Henan Jianye and Mark Milligan was signed from JEF United Ichihara Chiba after an impressive loan spell with Melbourne Victory under former coach Jim Magilton.

In July 2012 it was announced that the club had agreed to a sponsorship deal for naming rights of the newly formed statewide Victory League based in Tasmania.

On 18 October 2012 Daniel Allsopp announced his retirement from professional football after four games from the new season. while Nathan Coe returned to Australia to sign with Melbourne Victory on a three-year deal. on 24 October 2012.

During January transfer window, Petar Franjic, Isaka Cernak & Julius Davies were released and replaced by Francesco Stella, Jesse Makarounas, Jason Geria & Scott Galloway. Former Adelaide United defender Daniel Mullen was loaned from Dalian Aerbin to replace injured Nicolas Ansell for the rest of the season.

Melbourne Victory finished the season in third place in the ladder and lost to Central Coast Mariners in final series semi-final but they are qualified for 2014 Asian Champions League if Australia is given 2.5 slots based on the 2013 AFC Champions League evaluation.

On 18 April 2013, a few days before the previous season ended, Marco Rojas quit Melbourne Victory to pursue his career in Europe after Melbourne Victory was defeated in the final series semi-final. On the following day, Tando Velaphi, Diogo Ferreira, Sam Gallagher and Spase Dilevski were released from the club.

Players

Squad
As of 28 January 2013.

From the youth system

Transfers

Winter

In

Out

Summer

In

Out

Post-season

Out

Coaching staff

Competitions

Overall

A-League

Pre-season

Regular season

Finals series

Results summary

League table

National Youth League

Pre-season

Regular season

League table

Results summary

League Goalscorers by round

W-League

Regular season

Finals series

Results summary

League table

League goalscorers by round

Statistics

Squad stats
{|class="wikitable" style="text-align: center;"
|-
!
! style="width:70px;"|A-League
! style="width:70px;"|Finals
! style="width:70px;"|Total Stats
|-
|align=left|Games played      || 27 || 2 || 29
|-
|align=left|Games won         || 13 || 1 || 14
|-
|align=left|Games drawn       || 5 || 0 || 5
|-
|align=left|Games lost        || 9 || 1 || 10
|-
|align=left|Goals scored      || 48 || 2 || 50
|-
|align=left|Goals conceded     || 45 || 2 || 47
|-
|align=left|Goal difference || +3 || 0 || +3
|-
|align=left|Clean sheets      || 5 || 0 || 5
|-
|align=left|Red cards         || 2 || 0 || 2
|-

Player stats

Awards

Goal of the Week

Save of the Week

References

External links
 Official website
 A-League website
 W-League website
 National Youth League website
 Melbourne Victory Videos

2011-12
2012–13 A-League season by team